Karbala TV is the official television of the Imam Husayn Shrine in the city of Karbala, Iraq. With the great support of the Shia Endowment Bureau and continued guidance of the Supreme Religious Authority, headed by  Ayatullah Sayyid Ali al-Sistani, the channel was founded in 2008 in the city of Karbala, Iraq. Karbala TV is a multi-platform media organization that produces content for television, mobile devices, or through the net. The channel has over 50 video journalists worldwide.

The station's goals are to:

 Promote the School of Ahl al-Bait and spread its great principles and ideology.
 Unite Muslims by creating a healthy climate for harmony, cooperation, and understanding between all sects.
 Bridge communication with other religions and with the global accomplishments that are related to scientific research, culture, and the humanitarian discourse in general.
 Dispel the misconceptions and doubts about Islam and The School of Ahl al-Bait by presenting evidence and proof through scientific and contemporary discussions and programming.
 Empower the voice of the Hussaini Islamic creativity in the fields of literature and the arts: poetry, stories, theater, and video content in all its forms, in addition to audio performances to reciters of the Holy Quran and Hussaini poetry.
 Reclaim the scientific heritage that was marginalized (intentionally or unintentionally) at the level of global achievement that connects to Prophet Muhammad and his household (peace be upon them).
 Highlight the efforts of Muslim scholars, jurists, scientists, writers, philosophers, and their efforts and role in building societies.
 Publicize the picture of the Holy Shrines of Ahl al-Bait in its inspiring and spiritual feel with an emphasis on promoting the culture of visitation of the Holy Shrines and learning the lessons of dignity and faith from the personalities they embodied.
 Communicate with Muslims living in the West and highlight their great achievements.

See also

Television in Iraq

References

External links
 

Television stations in Iraq
Arab mass media
Arabic-language television stations
Television channels and stations established in 2008
Arab Spring and the media
Islamic television networks
Shia media